Aneel Mussarat is a British businessman, philanthropist and founder of MCR Property Group.

Born and raised in Manchester, Aneel began building a career in real estate shortly after leaving school. He founded MCR Property Group in 1989 and turned it into one of the country's best known developers with a track record of creating in excess of £5bn worth of residential and commercial projects. The Manchester-based company creates thousands of homes annually and currently employs 325 full-time employees. The group's combined holdings place it amongst the largest property groups in the North West along with Peel Holdings and Bruntwood.

In 2017 Aneel founded the Rafay Mussarat Foundation — named after his son, Rafay, and his late father — with a mission to tackle homelessness and provide vital healthcare and education to those trapped by poverty. The foundation operates in the UK, as well as in Pakistan. His work in Bangladesh led to an invitation to speak before the European parliament in 2018. MEP Amjad Bashir — who helped arrange the trip — told a session of the parliament in June that year that Aneel's work had been “amazing” and that he was “ashamed” of the international community's efforts in comparison.

Early life
Aneel was born in Manchester in November 1969 and is of Pakistani heritage. After completing high school, Aneel started to buy, renovate and rent out properties in Manchester.

Career
After completing high school, Aneel started to buy, renovate and rent out properties in Manchester and bought his first property at the age of 18. In 1989 Aneel founded Classic Homes. Having earned the title “Student Housing Magnate” following on from the notable “Student Villages” project, Aneel went on to found MCR Property Group, with their first purchase of Manchester city centre office blocks.

Politics
Aneel Mussarat became affiliated with Pakistan-based political party Pakistan Tehreek-e-Insaf in 2012 and has done considerable fundraising for them in the United Kingdom. Due to Mussarat's background in real estate development, he has advised Imran Khan on a key manifesto pledge, which was to implement a policy framework for building 5 million homes in Pakistan by the year 2023.

Philanthropy
In 2017 Aneel founded the Rafay Mussarat foundation. The Foundation's mission is to tackle homelessness and provide vital healthcare and education to those trapped by poverty. The foundation operates in the UK and Pakistan.

Aneel has personally financially contributed £3.5 million to the foundation and is very hands-on. Aneel attends weekly meetings with the foundation team, directing its activities and regularly makes trips overseas to assess potential projects.

In 2021, Aneel's Foundation began a £2million programme of building homeless shelters in Manchester, with Manchester City Council advising on delivery. The Foundation will deliver 1,000 places for homeless people by 2022, the aim being to combat drug and alcohol dependency and reintegrate those affected back into mainstream society.

In 2021, it partnered with the council during Ramadan to deliver food packages, clothing and sleeping bags. At the same time, it partnered with the Manchester-based charity Smile Aid to distribute 100,000 meals through food banks in Manchester's deprived Longsight area.

The Rafay Mussarat foundation has partnered with Minhaj Welfare Foundation to provide aid to Rohingya refugees during the Rohingya crisis. The foundation also conducted peace walks after the Manchester Arena terrorist attack. The walk began outside the Arena and continued towards St. Anne's Square where flowers, balloons, cards and candles were laid in memory of those who died.

Elsewhere in the UK, the Foundation has been a key donor to some of the country's best known charities, including National Autistic Society and Citizens Advice.

In Bangladesh, the foundation has delivered humanitarian aid. During three trips to the territory, Aneel and the Foundation delivered more than 1,037,000 meals to the refugees in Cox Bazar, Bangladesh, in addition to such essentials as dental hygiene supplies, healthcare provisions and camping equipment, simple items that are essential in making their stay more comfortable, ensuring the quality of life is raised during a horrendous ordeal.

His work all led to an invitation to speak before the European parliament in 2018. MEP Amjad Bashir — who helped arrange the trip — told a session of the parliament in June that year that Aneel's work had been “amazing” and that he was “ashamed” of the international community's efforts in comparison.

In Pakistan the foundation has sponsored healthcare, having recently pledged to develop nine free-to-use hospitals in Pakistan, and already runs a free eye and general hospital. The first of these hospitals is expected to welcome patients in 2023 with the other eight all being completed over the next decade. It is estimated that up to 10m people will benefit from these vital new facilities.

Between 2019 and 2021, the Foundation distributed over 30,000 food packages to Pakistan's poor — each designed to feed a family of five for a month. The Foundation also provides financial support to the Namal Institute in Mianwali District, Punjab.

Personal life
Mussarat is married, and has 4 children. He lives in Cheshire. He is a Sunni Muslim

Awards and recognition 
In 2008, Mussarat was listed on the Sunday Times Rich List, and ranked the 550th richest person in the United Kingdom. He was also awarded Businessman of the Year, at the British Muslim Awards in 2013.

In 2018, he received an honour for his business and philanthropic work at the Greater Manchester Business Leaders Dinner & Awards for his work in founding the Rafay Mussarat Foundation and his ongoing work to provide aid for Rohingya people.

In 2019, Mussarat was nominated in the category of Businessman of the Year in the English Asian Business Awards.

See also
 List of British Pakistanis

References

Sources
 Open house; in South Manchester Reporter

External links
MCR Property Group

1970 births
Living people
British real estate businesspeople
English people of Pakistani descent
English Muslims
British businesspeople of Pakistani descent